Christian Adinata (born 16 June 2001) is an Indonesian badminton player. Born in Pati, Christian Adinata started his career at the  Tangkas Intiland club. In 2021, he was selected to join the national team as an internship member. In 2019, he competed at the World Junior Championships in the boys' singles event.

Career

2022 
In April, he lost in the semi-finals of Orléans Masters from Indian player Mithun Manjunath after going from qualification. In latter May, he won a bronze medal in the men's team at the Southeast Asian Games.

In June, Adinata won his first senior title at the Italian International. In July, he competed at the Taipei Open but lost in the qualifying round. In October, he competed at the home tournament, Indonesia Masters Super 100 but lost in the quarter-finals from Taiwanese player Lee Chia-hao. In November, he lost in the second round of the Australian Open from Japanese player Kodai Naraoka.

2023 
In January, Adinata competed at the home tournament, Indonesia Masters, but had to lose in the first round from Japanese player Kenta Nishimoto in rubber games. In the next tournament, he lost in the second round of the Thailand Masters from Chinese Taipei player Lin Chun-yi.

Achievements

BWF International Challenge/Series (1 title) 
Men's singles

  BWF International Challenge tournament
  BWF International Series tournament
  BWF Future Series tournament

BWF Junior International (2 runners-up)  
Boys' singles

  BWF Junior International Grand Prix tournament
  BWF Junior International Challenge tournament
  BWF Junior International Series tournament
  BWF Junior Future Series tournament

Performance timeline

National team 
 Junior level

 Senior level

Individual competitions 
 Junior level

 Senior level

References

External links 
 

2001 births
Living people
People from Pati Regency
Indonesian male badminton players
Competitors at the 2021 Southeast Asian Games
Southeast Asian Games bronze medalists for Indonesia
Southeast Asian Games medalists in badminton
21st-century Indonesian people